Ayatollah Allama Syed Muhammad Dehlavi was a first Official Supreme Leader of Shiites of Pakistan & Shia scholar, who was elected as the first president of Shiite Demands Committee later called Tehrik-e-Nifaz-e-Fiqh-e-Jafaria (later called Tehrik-e-Jafaria Pakistan). He had authored his fiqhi resalah named Wasael-ush-Sharia in Urdu, and the famous Urdu book Tohfat-ul-Awam on Jafari fiqh was largely based on it.

References

Muhajir people
Pakistani Shia Muslims
Pakistani writers
Pakistani politicians
Year of birth missing
Year of death missing